Cecil Antonio "Tony" Richardson (5 June 1928 – 14 November 1991) was an English theatre and film director and producer whose career spanned five decades. In 1964, he won the Academy Award for Best Director for the film Tom Jones.

Early life 
Richardson was born in Shipley, West Riding of Yorkshire in 1928, the son of Elsie Evans (Campion) and Clarence Albert Richardson, a chemist. He was Head Boy at Ashville College, Harrogate and attended Wadham College, University of Oxford. His Oxford contemporaries included Rupert Murdoch, Margaret Thatcher, Kenneth Tynan, Lindsay Anderson and Gavin Lambert. He had the unprecedented distinction of being the President of both the Oxford University Dramatic Society and the Experimental Theatre Club (the ETC), in addition to being the theatre critic for the university magazine Isis. Those he cast in his student productions included Shirley Williams (as Cordelia), John Schlesinger, Nigel Davenport and Robert Robinson.

Career 

In 1955, in his directing debut, Richardson produced Jean Giraudoux's The Apollo of Bellac for television with Denholm Elliott and Natasha Parry in the main roles. Around the same time he began to be active in Britain's Free Cinema movement, co-directing the non-fiction short Momma Don't Allow (also 1955) with Karel Reisz.

Part of the British "New Wave" of directors, he was involved in the formation of the English Stage Company, along with his close friend George Goetschius and George Devine. He directed John Osborne's play Look Back in Anger at the Royal Court Theatre, and in the same period he directed Shakespeare in Stratford-upon-Avon. Then in 1957 he directed Laurence Olivier as Archie Rice in Osborne's next play The Entertainer, again for the Royal Court.

In 1959, Richardson co-founded Woodfall Film Productions with John Osborne and producer Harry Saltzman, and, as Woodfall's debut, directed the film version of Look Back in Anger (1959), his first feature film. The Entertainer (1960), A Taste of Honey (1961), and The Loneliness of the Long Distance Runner (1962), based on the novel by Alan Sillitoe, also were produced there.

Many of Richardson's films, such as A Taste of Honey and The Loneliness of the Long Distance Runner, were part of the acclaimed kitchen sink realism movement popular in Britain at the time, and several of his films continue to be held as cornerstones of the movement.

In 1964, Richardson received two Academy Awards (Best Director and Best Picture) for Tom Jones (1963) based on the novel by Henry Fielding.

His next film was The Loved One (1965), in which he worked with established stars, including John Gielgud, Rod Steiger and Robert Morse, and worked in Hollywood both on location and on the sound stage. In his autobiography, he confesses that he did not share the general admiration of Haskell Wexler, who worked on The Loved One as both director of photography and a producer.

Among stars that Richardson directed were Jeanne Moreau, Orson Welles, Rob Lowe, Milton Berle, Trevor Howard, David Hemmings, Nicol Williamson, Tom Courtenay, Lynn Redgrave, Marianne Faithfull, Richard Burton, Jodie Foster, Anthony Hopkins, Mick Jagger, Katharine Hepburn, Seth Green, Tommy Lee Jones and Judi Dench. His musical composers included Antoine Duhamel, John Addison and Shel Silverstein. His screenwriters were Jean Genet, Christopher Isherwood, Terry Southern, Marguerite Duras, Edward Bond (adapting Vladimir Nabokov) and Edward Albee. Richardson and Osborne eventually fell out during production of the film Charge of the Light Brigade (1968). The basic issue was Osborne's unwillingness to go through the rewrite process, more arduous in film than it is in the theatre. Richardson had a different version. In his autobiography (p. 195), he writes that Osborne was angry at being replaced in a small role by Laurence Harvey to whom the producers had obligations. Osborne took literary revenge by creating a fictionalised and pseudonymous Richardson – a domineering and arrogant character whom everyone hated – in his play The Hotel in Amsterdam.

Richardson's work was stylistically varied. Mademoiselle (1966) was shot noir-style on location in rural France with a static camera, monochrome film stock and no music. The Charge of the Light Brigade (1968) was part epic and part animated feature. Ned Kelly (1970) was what might be called an Aussie-western. Laughter in the Dark (1969) and A Delicate Balance (1973) were psycho-dramas. Joseph Andrews (1977), based on another novel by Henry Fielding, was a return to the mood of Tom Jones.

In 1970, Richardson was set to direct a film about Vaslav Nijinsky with a script by Edward Albee. It was to have starred Rudolf Nureyev as Nijinsky, Claude Jade as Romola and Paul Scofield as Diaghilev, but producer Harry Saltzman cancelled the project during pre-production.

In 1974, he travelled to Los Angeles to work on a script (never produced) with Sam Shepard, and took up residence there. Later that year, he began work on Mahogany (1975), starring Diana Ross, but was fired by Motown head Berry Gordy shortly after production began, owing to creative differences.

He wrote and directed the comedy-drama The Hotel New Hampshire (1984), based on John Irving's novel of the same name and starring Jodie Foster, Beau Bridges and Rob Lowe. Although it was a box-office failure, the film received a positive critical reception.

Richardson made four more major films before his death. His last, Blue Sky (1994), was not released for nearly three years after he died. Jessica Lange won a Best Actress Oscar for her performance in the film.

In 1966, Richardson financed the escape from Wormwood Scrubs prison of the spy and double agent George Blake.

Personal life 
Richardson was married to English actress Vanessa Redgrave from 1962 to 1967. The couple had two daughters, Natasha (1963–2009) and Joely Richardson (born 1965), then he left Redgrave for French actress and singer Jeanne Moreau. In 1972, he had a relationship with Grizelda Grimond, who was a secretary for Richardson's former business partner Oscar Lewenstein, and daughter of British politician Jo Grimond. Grizelda Grimond gave birth to his daughter, Katharine Grimond, on 8 January 1973.

Death
Richardson was bisexual, but never acknowledged it publicly until after he contracted HIV. He died of complications from AIDS on 14 November 1991 at the age of 63.

Filmography (as director)

 The Apollo of Bellac (TV, 1954)
 The Actor's End (TV, 1955)
 Momma Don't Allow (with Karel Reisz; 1955)
 Look Back in Anger (1959)
 The Entertainer (1960)
 A Subject of Scandal and Concern (1960)
 Sanctuary (1961)
 A Taste of Honey (1961)
 The Loneliness of the Long Distance Runner (1962)
 Tom Jones (1963)
 The Loved One (1965)
 Mademoiselle (1966)
 Red and Blue (1967)
 The Sailor from Gibraltar (1967)
 The Charge of the Light Brigade (1968)
 Laughter in the Dark  (1969)
 Hamlet (1969)
 Ned Kelly (1970)
 A Delicate Balance (1973)
 Dead Cert (1974)
 Mahogany (uncredited; replaced by Berry Gordy, 1975)
 Joseph Andrews (1977)
 A Death in Canaan (1978)
 The Border (1982)
 The Hotel New Hampshire (1984)
 Penalty Phase (TV, 1986)
 Beryl Markham: A Shadow on the Sun (1988)
 Women & Men: Stories of Seduction (with Frederic Raphael and Ken Russell; 1990)
 The Phantom of the Opera (TV, 1990)
 Blue Sky (1994)

Theatre
sources: Adler; Little & McLaughlin; Richardson

Bibliography

References

External links 
 
 
 BFI: Tony Richardson

1928 births
1991 deaths
AIDS-related deaths in California
Alumni of Wadham College, Oxford
Best British Screenplay BAFTA Award winners
Best Directing Academy Award winners
Bisexual screenwriters
Bisexual memoirists
Bisexual male actors
Bisexual businesspeople
British people of English descent
English film directors
English film producers
English memoirists
English television directors
English television producers
English theatre directors
Directors Guild of America Award winners
LGBT film directors
LGBT theatre directors
LGBT film producers
English LGBT screenwriters
English bisexual people
People educated at Ashville College
People from Shipley, West Yorkshire
Producers who won the Best Picture Academy Award
20th-century English screenwriters
20th-century English businesspeople
20th-century English LGBT people